The Worldwide Machine is a 1965 philosophical novel by Italian writer Paolo Volponi.

The book won the Strega Prize in the same year  and has been translated into several languages, including English and German.

Plot
After World War II, living in San Savino, a hamlet of Frontone in the province of Pesaro and Urbino, is Anteo Crocioni, a curious but unschooled young man who asks many questions about the origin of the world and living things, arriving at a conception that is both mechanistic and idealistic of what exists, which presupposes its creation by what he calls authorial automata. According to Anteo, if his theories were known in the world, steps would be taken toward friendship among peoples and universal peace. Instead, they leave his father, a small farmer who sees in his son a layabout and a dangerous protester (because of his inclinations toward communism) of the economic and social order represented by landowners, Christian Democracy and the Catholic Church, perplexed. However, it is with a young seminarian named Liborio that Anteo establishes a friendly relationship, finding in the boy a mind willing to listen and understand his worldview, though not to share it. Later Anteo meets Massimina, a girl from a neighboring village, and marries her.

To improve his economic condition he buys, in the wake of his fascination with mechanical means, several agricultural machines with which he starts a business as a contractor, despite the contrary opinion of his father and wife, who are reluctant to any idea of innovation. His work keeps him away from home for long periods, and when he returns he no longer finds Massimina there. He discovers that his wife, no longer determined to put up with his sudden outbursts, has moved to Rome to look for work as a housekeeper, counting on the support of the sizeable Marche community that has emigrated there. Anteo sells the cars and also travels to the capital, to bring his wife home while seizing the opportunity to show professors and students at the Sapienza University of Rome his theories and the treatise he is writing, which, however, do not meet with the slightest success with them.

After running out of money, he practices various trades to support himself, including cleaning lion cages in a circus and manages to track down Maximina thanks to a complaint for abandonment of the marital roof that he files against her. The young woman now works as a servant in a stately home and, to protect herself against her husband, sues him for battery. Anteo is thus forced by judicial authority to leave Rome and returns to San Savino to await trial. He finds Liberio, who in the meantime has been ordained a priest and appointed parish priest of Acquaviva, and helps him get settled in the rectory house. One day he meets by chance his wife, who has come to visit her places of origin; she does not deny herself the consummation of sexual intercourse with her husband but refuses to return home.

Several months later, Anteo learns from the newspapers that Massimina has secretly given birth to a child, conceived from the intercourse she had that day, leaving him to die for lack of care; the woman is then arrested for infanticide. Anteo then decides to end his existence by filling his house with explosives and blowing it up after locking himself inside.

Critical reception
Anteo's actions were analyzed by several reviewers, including Romano Luperini, who moreover considers them an effective instrument of social denunciation, to a madness that the character deserves. Giuliano Manacorda considers the writing to be excessively forced and cerebral, especially in comparison with Volponi's earlier novel Memoriale. Walter Pedullà emphasizes the disruptive rebellious charge inherent in the protagonist, thanks in part to an unprejudiced and disorienting use of his language. Kirkus Reviews said that the novel was "closer to Musil and Kafka, to dehydrated prose, indirect representation, and allegorical issues."

References

External links
The Worldwide Machine  at the Open Library.

1965 novels
Philosophical novels
Italian novels
20th-century Italian novels
Strega Prize-winning works